Crime Takes a Holiday is a 1938 American crime film directed by Lewis D. Collins and written by Jefferson Parker, Henry Altimus and Charles Logue. The film stars Jack Holt, Marcia Ralston, Russell Hopton, Douglass Dumbrille, Arthur Hohl, Thomas E. Jackson and John Wray. The film was released on October 5, 1938, by Columbia Pictures.

Plot
A policeman is murdered and District Attorney Walter Forbes gets an ex-con to take the blame in order for the real culprit to be more at ease. Forbes calls the real killer, but wires to conversation to broadcast over the radio.

Cast          
Jack Holt as Walter Forbes
Marcia Ralston as Margaret 'Peggy' Stone
Russell Hopton as Jerry Clayton
Douglass Dumbrille as J.J. Grant
Arthur Hohl as Joe Whitehead
Thomas E. Jackson as Brennan
John Wray as Howell
William Pawley as Spike
Paul Fix as Louie
Harry Woods as Stoddard
Joseph Crehan as Gov. Bill Allen

References

External links
 

1938 films
1930s English-language films
American crime drama films
Columbia Pictures films
Films directed by Lewis D. Collins
1938 crime drama films
American black-and-white films
1930s American films